Christian Fuanda Kinkela (born 25 May 1982) is a Congolese professional footballer who plays as a right winger for Jura Dolois in the Championnat National 3. He made 25 appearances for the Congo DR national team scoring one goal.

Club career
Kinkela signed a two-year deal for AC Ajaccio from Ligue 1 side US Boulogne on 17 July 2009.

International career
Kinkela made his Congo DR national team debut in 2004. He was a member of the Congo squad at the 2006 African Nations Cup which progressed to the quarter finals, where it was eliminated by Egypt, which eventually won the tournament.

References

External links
 
 
 
 
 

1982 births
Living people
Footballers from Kinshasa
Democratic Republic of the Congo footballers
Democratic Republic of the Congo international footballers
2006 Africa Cup of Nations players
Association football defenders
Association football midfielders
Tours FC players
Racing Club de France Football players
Amiens SC players
Paris FC players
US Boulogne players
AC Ajaccio players
CS Sedan Ardennes players
Royale Union Saint-Gilloise players
Moreirense F.C. players
LB Châteauroux players
SO Romorantin players
Stade Malherbe Caen players
AS Muret players
Jura Dolois Football players
Ligue 1 players
Ligue 2 players
Primeira Liga players
Democratic Republic of the Congo expatriate footballers
Expatriate footballers in France
Expatriate footballers in Belgium
Expatriate footballers in Portugal
Democratic Republic of the Congo expatriate sportspeople in France
Democratic Republic of the Congo expatriate sportspeople in Belgium
Democratic Republic of the Congo expatriate sportspeople in Portugal
21st-century Democratic Republic of the Congo people